The Piqua Center (formerly the Miami Valley Centre Mall) is an enclosed shopping mall in Piqua, Ohio, United States, opened in 1988. The mall's anchor store is Dunham's Sports. There are 3 vacant anchor stores that were once Sears, Elder-Beerman and JCPenney. The mall also has a Comfort Inn.

History
One of the original anchors was J. C. Penney, which moved from a store downtown that had been operational since 1922. The other anchors were Elder-Beerman and Hills (later Ames).

In 1999, Sears moved to the mall from an existing store at nearby (now defunct) Piqua East Mall (formerly Piqua Mall). In reaction to this move, Elder-Beerman attempted to sue to keep Sears from opening there. The Sears store opened in October of that year. Later, a Little Professor bookstore opened in the mall. Previously, the mall did not have a bookstore.

Ames closed its store at the mall in 2000. Four years later, the space became Steve & Barry's. Other stores that opened in 2004 included Quiznos and CJ Banks. In 2008, the theater complex in the mall was replaced by a  Cinemark complex on an outparcel. At the end of the same year, Steve & Barry's closed. In June 2014, it was reported that Dunham's Sports would be moving into the vacated Steve & Barry's by year's end.

Elder-Beerman closed on August 26, 2018, due to the bankruptcy of parent company The Bon-Ton.

After a November 8, 2018 announcement that Sears would be closing as part of a plan to close 40 locations, the store closed in February 2019.

On June 4, 2020, JCPenney announced that it would close by October 2020 as part of a plan to close 154 stores nationwide. After JCPenney closed, Dunham's Sports became the only remaining anchor store.

In March 2023, Kohan Retail Investment Group sold the Miami Valley Center Mall to a partnership between Ohio-based Bruns Construction Enterprises and Minnesota-based Caspian Group and renamed the Piqua Center.

References

External links
 

1988 establishments in Ohio
Buildings and structures in Miami County, Ohio
Shopping malls in Ohio
Shopping malls established in 1988
Kohan Retail Investment Group